Tamer Hassan (born 18 March 1968) is a British actor. He is best known for his role as the leader of the Millwall firm, opposite Danny Dyer, in The Football Factory. Hassan has also appeared in Batman Begins, Declan O'Brien's Wrong Turn 3: Left for Dead, and 2011's The Double with Topher Grace.

Early life
Hassan was born and brought up in New Cross, London into a Turkish Cypriot family.

Hassan started boxing at the age of 10. He started an amateur boxing career at the age of 17 where he won two British titles. Having sustained an injury in amateur boxing, he turned to running  nightclubs and restaurants.

Acting career
Hassan started acting in television before his role in The Calcium Kid. He was cast as the leader of a fictional football firm in The Football Factory. The film's director Nick Love subsequently cast him in the primary supporting role for The Business.

Hassan has had roles in films including The Ferryman, Batman Begins, Cass, Eastern Promises, and Clash of the Titans, in which he portrayed Ares, the ancient Greek god of war. In 2011, he played "The Boss", a shady police officer, in the British film noir Jack Falls. He played "Chavez" in Wrong Turn 3: Left for Dead.

In 2016 he joined the HBO series Game of Thrones in Season 6 as Khal Forzo.

Filmography

Personal life
Hassan is married and has two children: a son who is a football player, and a daughter, Belle, who appeared in the fifth series of Love Island in 2019.

He is also a close friend  of actor Danny Dyer.

He is a fan of Millwall.

References

External links

1968 births
Living people
English male film actors
English male television actors
English people of Turkish Cypriot descent
Male actors from London